Case theory may refer to:

 Grammatical case theory, in grammar
 Case theory (in law)